The Ogahis or Ogahi Mughals (Sindhi: اوڳاھي; Punjabi: اوگاہی) are a Mughal tribe primarily living in the provinces of Sindh and Punjab, Pakistan. They are a land-owning tribe of Pakistan. The majority lives in Sindh and Punjab while a small number is also present in Khyber Pakhtunkhwa and Balochistan. The Ogahi tribesmen speak Sindhi, Saraiki and Punjabi languages and are predominantly Muslims. They have the surnames Mir, Sardar, Jam, Khan and Mian.

Distribution 
The Ogahis are a land-owning Mughal tribe of Pakistan primarily living in Punjab, Sindh and Khyber Pakhtunkhwa in the areas of Tandianwala, Lahore, Nankana Saahib, Syedwala, Jaranwala, Kashmore, Sukkur, Dera Ismail Khan, Ghotki, Hyderabad, Shikarpur, and Kandhkot. They are also found in other areas of Khyber Pakhtunkhwa and Balochistan.

References

Sindhi tribes
Punjabi tribes
Social groups of Pakistan
Mongol peoples
Turkic peoples
Mughal clans of Pakistan
Ethnic groups in Pakistan
Pakistani people of Mongol descent
Pakistani people of Turkic descent
Surnames